Smart Casual is the debut album from Kids in Glass Houses, recorded during late 2007 at Long Wave Studios with Romesh Dodangoda. The album contains songs the band have written since the release of their five-track EP "E-Pocalypse!", and also three tracks from the EP.

The lead single from the album is "Easy Tiger" and was released on 10 March 2008. It was released as a digital download, and on a limited pressing of 2000 vinyl. The music video for the single received considerable plays on music channels. "Give Me What I Want" was also released as a single on 19 May, followed by "Saturday" on 11 August.

The album entered the UK charts at and charted at number 29 on the week of its release.

The song "Girls" is used as the theme song for Totally Calum Best: The Best Is Yet To Come. The song "Raise Hell" was formerly known as "My Def Posse" and still referred to by some fans.

A Special Edition release included a bonus DVD.

Track listing
All tracks written by Aled Phillips, Iain Mahanty, Joel Fisher, Andrew Shay and Philip Jenkins unless otherwise stated. All lyrics by Aled Phillips.

Personnel
Aled Phillips - lead vocals, lyrics
Iain Mahanty - lead guitar, backing vocals
Joel Fisher - rhythm guitar
Andrew Shay - bass guitar
Phil Jenkins - drums, percussion

Certifications

References

Kids in Glass Houses albums
2008 debut albums
Albums produced by Romesh Dodangoda